Jeannelius is a genus of beetles in the family Carabidae, containing the following species:

 Jeannelius birsteini Ljovuschkin, 1963
 Jeannelius gloriosus Ljovuschkin, 1965
 Jeannelius magnificus Kurnakov, 1959
 Jeannelius zhicharevi Lutshnik, 1915

References

Trechinae